Aalamaram is located in the mining city of Kolar Gold Fields. The surrounding residential places include Palar Nagar, Bharath Nagar, HP Nagar, Hanumantha Nagar, MV Nagar, and Officer's Quarters.

It is close to a range of small hills of volcanic rocks. About 1 km towards Kolar Gold Fields you can find Poonumalai Murugan temple.

Villages in Kolar district